Paul Chalmer Lingrel (January 21, 1899 – March 11, 1962) was a professional football player who played in the National Football League during the 1923 season. That season, he joined the NFL's Oorang Indians. The Indians were a team based in LaRue, Ohio, composed only of Native Americans, and coached by Jim Thorpe.

References

Uniform Numbers of the NFL

1899 births
1962 deaths
American football running backs
Native American players of American football
Oorang Indians players
Miami RedHawks football players
Players of American football from Ohio